Shallop is a name used for several types of boats and small ships (French chaloupe) used for coastal navigation from the seventeenth century. Originally smaller boats based on the chalupa, the watercraft named this ranged from small boats a little larger than a banks dory to gunboats. The larger vessels of this design could carry a substantial load and be armed with cannon.

Captain John Smith used shallops to explore Chesapeake Bay in the summer of 1608. The boats were disassembled and stowed aboard the Susan Constant, being reassembled when the colonists arrived in North America.

The Danes armed large boats called shallops for use as gunboats, particularly in the Gunboat War (1807–1814) between Denmark–Norway and the British Navy during the Napoleonic Wars.

See also
Whale boat

References

Boats